The 6th Chess Olympiad, organized by the FIDE and comprising an open and (unofficial) women's tournament, as well as several events designed to promote the game of chess, took place between August 16 and August 31, 1935, in Warsaw, Poland. The famous retired Polish master Dawid Przepiórka took the major responsibility as a chairman of Organizing Committee.

The Women's World Chess Championship also took place during the Olympiad.

Results

Team standings

{| class="wikitable"
! # !!Country !!Players !! Points
|-
| style="background:gold;"|1 ||  || Fine, Marshall, Kupchik, Dake, Horowitz || 54 
|-
| style="background:silver;"|2 ||  || Ståhlberg, Stoltz, Lundin, Danielsson, Larsson || 52½
|-
|  style="background:#cc9966;"|3 ||  || Tartakower, Frydman, Najdorf, Friedman, Makarczyk || 52
|-
| 4 ||  || Steiner L., Lilienthal, Havasi, Szabó, Réthy || 51
|-
| 5 ||  || Flohr, Opočenský, Rejfíř, Treybal K., Pelikán || 49
|-
| 6 ||  || Vidmar, Pirc, Kostić, Trifunović, König || 45½
|-
| 7 ||  || Grünfeld, Spielmann, Eliskases, Müller, Podhorzer || 43½
|-
| 8 ||  || Grau, Bolbochán Jac., Pleci, Maderna || 42
|-
| 9 ||  || Petrovs, Apšenieks, Feigins, Hasenfuss, Krūmiņš || 41
|-
| 10 ||  || Alekhine, Betbeder, Muffang, Kahn, Raizman || 38
|-
| 11 ||  || Keres, Friedemann, Laurine, Raud, Kibbermann || 37½
|-
| 12 ||  || Winter, Thomas, Alexander, Atkins, Golombek || 37
|-
| 13 ||  || Böök, Rasmusson, Solin, Krogius, Salo || 35
|-
| 14 ||  || Mikėnas, Machtas, Vistaneckis, Vaitonis, Luckis || 34
|-
| 15 ||  || Foerder, Enoch, Dobkin, Winz, Czerniak || 32
|-
| 16 ||  || Andersen, Nielsen B., Enevoldsen, Nielsen J., Sørensen || 31½
|-
| 17 ||  || Silbermann, Ichim, Bródy, Erdélyi, Popa || 27½
|-
| 18 ||  || Sacconi, Monticelli, Rosselli del Turco, Romi, Napolitano  || 24
|-
| 19 ||  || Naegeli, Grob, Michel, Stähelin, Gygli || 21
|-
| 20 ||  || Reilly, Creevey, O'Hanlon, Cranston, De Burca || 12
|}

Team results

Individual medals

The prizes for best individual results went to:

 Board 1:  Salo Flohr 13 / 17 = 76.5%
 Board 2:  Andor Lilienthal 15 / 19 = 78.9%
 Board 3:  Erich Eliskases 15 / 19 = 78.9%
 Board 4:  Arthur Dake 15½ / 18 = 86.1%
 Reserve:  Al Horowitz 12 / 15 = 80.0%

References 

 6th Chess Olympiad: Warsaw 1935 OlimpBase

06
Olympiad 06
Chess Olympiad 06
Olympiad 06
Chess Olympiad 06
20th century in Warsaw